Marie Pierre Adrien Francastel (1761–1831) was a French politician. During the French Revolution, he was elected to the National Convention from Eure department, and joined the Mountain. Francastel took part, on the Republican side, in the War in the Vendée, including during the Siege of Angers.

Notes

Bibliography 
 « Marie Pierre Adrien Francastel », dans Adolphe Robert et Gaston Cougny, Dictionnaire des parlementaires français, Edgar Bourloton, 1889-1891
 Jules Michelet, Histoire de la Révolution française 
 Camille Bourcier, E. Barassé ed., Essai sur la Terreur en Anjou, 1870
 Mémoires de la Société Nationale d'Agriculture, Sciences et Arts d'Angers, 1914

Deputies to the French National Convention
1761 births
1831 deaths
People from Eure